Euxoa agema is a moth of the family Noctuidae. It is found from British Columbia, south to Colorado and California.

The wingspan is about 30 mm.

External links
Images

Euxoa
Moths of North America
Moths described in 1899